Kovno Governorate or Governorate of Kaunas was a governorate (guberniya) of the Russian Empire. Its capital was Kaunas (Kovno in Russian). It was formed on 18 December 1842 by Tsar Nicholas I from the western part of Vilna Governorate, and the order was carried out on 1 July 1843. It was part of the Vilna Governorate-General and Northwestern Krai. The governorate included almost the entire Lithuanian region of Samogitia and the northern part of Aukštaitija.

Counties
The governorate was divided into seven uyezds:

References

Further reading
 
 

 
Governorates of the Russian Empire
History of Kaunas
Historical regions in Lithuania
1843 establishments in the Russian Empire